Circus Palestine  (translit. Kirkas Palestina) is a 1998 Israeli political satire film directed by Eyal Halfon, which was nominated for seven Israeli Film Academy Awards, winning five. The film was selected as the Israeli entry for the Best Foreign Language Film at the 71st Academy Awards, but was not accepted as a nominee.

Plot 
A Russian circus arrives on the West Bank during the intifada. The war rages, the circus acts perform and a lion escapes in the middle of the night. An Israeli officer falls in love with the lion tamer and helps her search for it. They encounter the absurdities of life living under a military occupation. Though an unlikely plot, it was based on a true story.

Cast 
 Yoram Hattab as Shimshon Bleiberg
 Jenya Dodina as Marianna Stasenko
 Amos Lavi as Colonel Oz
  as Circus Boss
 Bassam Zuamut as Ibrahim
 Rinan Haim as Lugassi

Reception
Won 5 awards from the Israeli Film Academy Awards:
 Best Actor - Yoram Hattab
 Best Actor - Amos Lavi
 Best Film
 Best Music - Shlomo Gronich
 Best Screenplay - Eyal Halfon

See also
 List of submissions to the 71st Academy Awards for Best Foreign Language Film
 List of Israeli submissions for the Academy Award for Best Foreign Language Film

References

External links 
 

1998 films
1998 drama films
Israeli drama films